Bonehill is a surname. Notable people with the surname include:

 Bessie Bonehill (1855–1902), English vaudeville singer
 Richard Bonehill (c. 1948–2015), British actor and stuntman
 Joshua Bonehill-Paine (born 1992), English far-right nationalist

See also
 Bone Hill (disambiguation)